The 1990 Belgian motorcycle Grand Prix was the ninth round of the 1990 Grand Prix motorcycle racing season. It took place on the weekend of 5–7 July 1990 at Spa-Francorchamps.

References

Belgian motorcycle Grand Prix
Belgian
1990 in Belgian motorsport